Governor Sadler may refer to:

James Hayes Sadler (colonial administrator) (1851–1922), Governor of the British East Africa Protectorate from 1905 to 1909 and Governor of the Windward Islands from 1909 to 1914
Reinhold Sadler (1848–1906), 9th Governor of Nevada from 1896 to 1903